Colonels Academy, a co-educational senior secondary school of Katihar, Bihar, India was established in 2008 at Colonels Academy Road, Army Camp in the State of Bihar.

Chronology
 24 December 2007	Release of  Prospectus  by Honorable Justice Shiv Kriti Singh
 17 January 2008	School logo was unveiled by Mr. C. K. Anil, IAS (Sec Agriculture)
 10 February 2008	Inauguration of the School Mr. Prakash Jha (Film Director)
 18 April 2008	First day of the Colonels Academy in    action
 8 December 2008    	Visit of Dr. (Prof.) Ajay Kumar (JNU)
 18 February 2009		Visit of Sarode Maestro Padmshree Pt. Biswajit Roy Choudhury
 				 
 17 November 2009		Visit of Kathak Maestro Padmshree  Guru Shovna Narayana
 30 Oct to 4 Nov’09 	Himalayan Trekking Expedition Manebhanjan (6300 ft) to Sandakphu (12000 ft) via Tumling (9300 ft) 	
 Kalpokhri (10360 ft)
 8 September 2010	Visit of Padmabhusan Dr.Teejan Bai, an Exponent of Pandavani.
 28 Mar to 2 Apr ‘11	Nukard Natak Workshop under famous social worker Father Anand.

Campus

Colonels Academy is located between Army Camp, Sirsa in the West and Mongra Railway crossing in the East.

The academy is divided into following parts

 Major Amiya Block – Main academic block of  Colonels Academy where Library, Laboratories, Class Rooms, Activity Hall, and Smart Classes are situated. OAT ( Open Air Theater ) is facing this Block.
 Chanakya – It is the administrative block of the school.
 Muteshwari Block – It is the Junior Academic Building of the school.
 New Boy’s Hostel
 Staff Flat Block
 Swimming Pool and Hurdle Game Zone

House System

There are six houses in the school: Lincoln, Mandela, Bradman, Kalam, Neruda, and Tolstoy. Each student from class I onward is allotted one of the houses. Each house is headed by a girl and boy house captain. A member of the staff assisted by several other teachers (tutors) acts as the House Warden. The points are awarded to the students throughout the year for extra curricular activities through Inter-House competitions in sports, dramas, debates, quizzes, arts and music and prizes/trophies are awarded accordingly. At the end of the year, the house gaining the highest points is awarded the championship trophy.

Clubs
The school has the following clubs for the activities which are held on Wednesday:

 Literary club 
 Eco Club
 Science club
 Multimedia Club
 Social Club c
 Magazine club
 Nukad Natak club

Sports

The school have a number of games facilities for basketball, football, tennis, swimming volleyball, hockey and cricket.

References

Schools in Bihar
Katihar
Educational institutions established in 2008
2008 establishments in Bihar